1910 Országos Bajnokság I (men's water polo) was the seventh water polo championship in Hungary. There were two teams who played one match for the title.

Final list 

* M: Matches W: Win D: Drawn L: Lost G+: Goals earned G-: Goals got P: Point

Sources 
Gyarmati Dezső: Aranykor (Hérodotosz Könyvkiadó és Értékesítő Bt., Budapest, 2002.)

1910 in water polo
1910 in Hungarian sport
Seasons in Hungarian water polo competitions